The Malta national under-19 football team is the under-19 football team of Malta. It is controlled by the Malta Football Association.

Players

Current squad 
 The following players were called up for the UEFA Preparatory Tournament matches.
 Match dates: 23, 26 and 29 November 2022
 Opposition: ,  and 
Caps and goals correct as of: 26 September 2022, after the match against .

References 

European national under-19 association football teams
under-19
Youth football in Malta